The North American T-2 Buckeye was the United States Navy's intermediate training aircraft, intended to introduce U.S. Navy and U.S. Marine Corps student naval aviators and student naval flight officers to jets. It entered service in 1959, beginning the replacement process of the Lockheed T2V SeaStar, and was itself replaced by the McDonnell Douglas T-45 Goshawk in 2008.

Design and development
In 1956, the US Navy issued a requirement for a jet-powered basic trainer to replace its T-28 piston-engined aircraft. (Primary training for the US Navy remained the responsibility of the piston-engined Beechcraft T-34 Mentor while the jet-powered Lockheed T2V SeaStar provided more advanced training). North American Aviation won the US Navy's competition for the new training aircraft in mid-1956 with its NA-241 design. North American's design, designated the T2J-1 by the US Navy, was a mid-winged monoplane with trainee and instructor sitting in tandem on North American-built ejection seats, with the rear (instructor's) seat raised to give a good view over the trainee's head. The aircraft's unswept wing's structure was based on that of the FJ-1 Fury, while its control system was based on the T-28C. While it had no built-in armament, the T2J-1 could accommodate two .50-inch gun pods,  practice bombs, or 2.75-inch rockets beneath the wings. The T-2's performance was between that of the U.S. Air Force's Cessna T-37 Tweet and the U.S. Navy's TA-4J Skyhawk.

The first T2J-1 flew on 31 January 1958, and the type entered service with Basic Training Group Seven, soon to become VT-7 at Naval Air Station Meridian in 1959. A second training group, VT-9 formed at Meridian in 1961.

The first version of the aircraft entered service in 1959 as the T2J-1. It was redesignated the T-2A in 1962 under the joint aircraft designation system. The aircraft was subsequently redesigned, and the single engine was replaced with two  Pratt & Whitney J60-P-6 turbojets in the T-2B. The T-2C was fitted with two  thrust General Electric J85-GE-4 turbojets. The T-2D and T-2E were export versions for the Venezuelan Air Force and Hellenic Air Force, respectively. The T-2 Buckeye (along with the TF-9J Cougar) replaced the T2V-1/T-1A SeaStar, though the T-1 continued in some uses into the 1970s.

All T-2 Buckeyes were manufactured by North American at Air Force Plant 85, located just south of Port Columbus Airport in Columbus, Ohio. A total of 609 aircraft were built during the production run. The name Buckeye refers to the state tree of Ohio, as well as the mascot of Ohio State University.

Every jet-qualified Naval Aviator and virtually every Naval Flight Officer from the late 1950s until 2004 received training in the T-2 Buckeye, a length of service spanning over four decades.  The aircraft first exited the Naval Aviator strike pipeline (where it saw its final carrier landings) in 2004, and the Naval Flight Officer tactical jet pipeline in 2008. In the Naval Aviator strike pipeline syllabus and the Naval Flight Officer strike and strike fighter pipeline syllabi, the T-2 has been replaced by the near-sonic McDonnell Douglas T-45 Goshawk (the U.S. Navy version of the BAE Systems Hawk), which is more comparable to other high-performance, subsonic trainers, or the supersonic U.S. Air Force Northrop T-38 Talon. More recently, the T-2 has been used as a director aircraft for aerial drones. Several T-2 Buckeyes, although still retaining their USN markings, are now registered as civilian-owned aircraft with FAA "N" numbers; they regularly appear at airshows.

Variants

T-2A
Two-seat intermediate jet training aircraft, powered by a 3,400-lb (1542-kg) thrust Westinghouse J34-WE-46/48 turbojet, original designation T2J-1 Buckeye, 217 built
YT-2B
Two T-2As were converted into T-2B prototype aircraft.
T-2B
Improved version, it was powered by two 3,000-lb (1360-kg) thrust Pratt & Whitney J60-P-6 turbojets; 97 were built.
YT-2C
One T-2B was converted into a T-2C prototype aircraft.
T-2C
Final production version for the U.S. Navy, it was powered by two 2,950-lbf thrust General Electric J85-GE-4 turbojets; 231 were built.
DT-2B and DT-2C
Small numbers of T-2Bs and T-2Cs were converted into drone directors.
T-2D
Export version for Venezuela, 12 built
T-2E
Export version for Greece, 40 built

Operators

Current operators 

 Hellenic Air Force

Former operators 

 United States Navy

 Bolivarian Military Aviation

Aircraft on display
 158599 - on static display at the Texas Air Museum in Slaton, Texas on loan from the National Naval Aviation Museum.

Specifications (T-2C Buckeye)

See also

References

 "Rockwell Buckeye: Success the second time round for the T-2". Air Enthusiast, October 1973, Volume 5 Number 4, pp. 163–169. 
 Taylor, John W. R. Jane's All The World's Aircraft 1976–77. London: Jane's Yearbooks, 1976. .

External links

T-2 Buckeye page on U.S. Navy History site
T2J-l / T-2 Buckeye on GlobalSecurity.org
Boeing T-2 History Page

Carrier-based aircraft
1950s United States military trainer aircraft
T-02 Buckeye
Twinjets
Aircraft first flown in 1958
Mid-wing aircraft